The BOV M11 is part of the BOV family of light armored vehicles. The M11 is a 4x4 all-wheel drive vehicle specialized in reconnaissance. It is armored vehicle manufactured in Yugoimport SDPR factory in Velika Plana, Serbia.

Description
 
The BOV M11 has a primary role as  reconnaissance vehicle and command-reconnaissance vehicle. If used by artillery units it could be remote observation post that observes enemy and guides firing. It has a crew of 3, including  driver, commander and  gunner. Has room for four more personnel that could include based on concrete mission scouts and artillery command platoon’s CO. The vehicle has a four-wheel drive and is powered by a diesel engine developing 190 hp. It has many special reconnaissance systems and artillery systems built in based on concrete mission role. Driver has thermal camera sight at front and CCD TV camera at rear. It is armed with 12.7 mm remote-controlled weapon station for day and night combat and fire on move and stand. It is possible to integrate another RCWS with 7.62mm gun and for more recce combat role RCWS with 30 mm grenade launcher BGA-30 or M10 RCWS with 20mm gun and 7.62mm coaxial gun.

Equipment for artillery reconnaissance vehicle include:
1. Artillery electronic direction finder (AEG)
2. Communications equipment
3. Artillery battery FCS computer

Operators

Current operators
 - Bangladesh Army operates 8+ vehicles.
 - Unspecified number ordered.
 - Gendarmery 12 in service.

See also

Cadillac Gage Commando
M1117

References

Armoured fighting vehicles of Serbia
Military Technical Institute Belgrade
Military vehicles introduced in the 2010s